Nina Vankova Nikolova is a Bulgarian climatologist, and a professor at Sofia University.

Biography 
Nikolova graduated from Sofia University in 1991 with a degree in geography. She defended her doctoral dissertation "Changes in air temperature in the mountainous part of Bulgaria" on 27 February 1991.

From February 1999 to January 2000, she was a specialist at the Meteorological Research Institute in Tsukuba, Japan, where she conducted research on global and regional climate change. Since 2001 she has been appointed as an assistant, and then as a chief assistant in the Department of Climatology, Hydrology and Geomorphology in the Faculty of Geology and Geography at Sofia University.

In 2001 she was appointed as a specialist geographer at the National Institute of Meteorology and Hydrology at the Bulgarian Academy of Sciences. Since April 2008 she has been a docent, and in 2018 she became a professor.

She is an editor of international journals Geographica Pannonica, Forum Geografie, Acta Hydrologica Slovaca, the Bulletin of the Serbian Geographical Society, and Geographic Society of the Republic of Srpska. She is a member of the International Association for Urban Climate and International Association of Geomorphologists in Bulgaria.

She is the author or co-author of over 70 articles, studies, reports, and textbooks.

Works

Notes

References

External links 
 

Academic staff of Sofia University
Sofia University alumni
Bulgarian geographers
Climatologists
Bulgarian women scientists
21st-century Bulgarian scientists
Year of birth missing (living people)
Living people